Michael McKeown Bondhus (born Charlie, 1981) is an American poet and author of four books. His second book, All the Heat We Could Carry, was the winner of the 2013 Main Street Rag Poetry Book Award, the 2014 Thom Gunn Award for Gay Poetry, and a finalist for the Gival Press Poetry Book Award.

Life
He grew up in Connecticut and graduated from Saint Anselm College. He received his MFA from Goddard College and his Ph.D. from the University of Massachusetts Amherst. He served as poetry editor at The Good Men Project from 2013 to 2017, and currently teaches English and creative writing at Raritan Valley Community College.

His work has appeared in Poetry, The Missouri Review, Hayden's Ferry Review, The Baltimore Review, Copper Nickel, Bellevue Literary Review, and Cold Mountain Review, among others.

He is openly gay.

Books 
 
 
 
 All the Heat We Could Carry. Main Street Rag. 2013. .

Awards 
 2007 Blue Light Press First Book Award Finalist for How the Boy Might See It
 2008/2009 Brickhouse Books Stonewall Competition Winner for What We Have Learned to Love
 2013 Main Street Rag Poetry Book Award
 2013 Gival Press Poetry Book Award—Finalist
 2014 Thom Gunn Award for All the Heat We Could Carry
 2016 Brittingham/Pollak Award Finalist for Divining Bones
 2017 Tampa Review Prize Finalist for Divining Bones

References

External links 

Living people
1981 births
Saint Anselm College alumni
Goddard College alumni
University of Massachusetts Amherst alumni
Poets from Connecticut
American educators
American LGBT poets
LGBT people from Connecticut
American gay writers
American male poets
21st-century American poets
21st-century American male writers
Gay poets